Kurt and Sid is a play by Roy Smiles which had its world premiere at the Trafalgar Studios in London's West End. The play opened on 9 September 2009 and starred Danny Dyer (as Sid Vicious) and Shaun Evans (as Kurt Cobain). Kurt and Sid was directed by Tim Stark, developed by B29 Productions and produced by Thomas Hopkins and Andrew Jenkins. The play ran until 3 October 2009.

Development
Sid Vicious was only portrayed in the 1986 film Sid and Nancy previously. Although Kurt Cobain had never previously been portrayed in film or stage, a character based on Cobain, named Blake, appeared in the 2005 film Last Days. Danny Dyer first became interested in having a role when Tim Stark the director told him about it 6 years before the play opened. Shaun Evans grew out his hair for the role of Kurt Cobain and dyed his hair blond. Dyer thought that it would be interesting to see how the audience reacts because of the play being both dark and light.

Plot
Kurt decides to commit suicide, but Sid stops him. Sid may have come back from the dead to save someone after killing Nancy Spungen. Sid and Kurt discuss what it is like to be famous and their problems. Sid tries to convince Kurt that he should not take his life. The play takes place in Kurt's greenhouse.

Reception
Charles Spencer in The Daily Telegraph gave the play four stars: "Roy Smiles has created a cracking play about Kurt Cobain and Sid Vicious in Kurt and Sid". He added, "There are two startling achievements in Kurt & Sid. Smiles turns the sad and wasteful story of Cobain, a heroin addict who blew his brains out with a shotgun in 1994, into a work that is at once laugh-out-loud funny, touching and thought-provoking. Perhaps even more remarkably, he turns Sid Vicious, late of the Sex Pistols and perhaps the most worthless individual ever to emerge even from the murky world of rock music, into a highly engaging hero." The Guardian were more critical, with Lyn Gardner awarding it just 2 stars.

References

External links
Official Show Website

2009 plays
English plays
Plays based on real people
Biographical plays about musicians
Cultural depictions of the Sex Pistols
Cultural depictions of Kurt Cobain